Exotic mesons are mesons that have quantum numbers not possible in the quark model; some proposals for non-standard quark model mesons could be:
glueballs or gluonium Glueballs have no valence quarks at all.
tetraquarks Tetraquarks have two valence quark–antiquark pairs.
hybrid mesons Hybrid mesons contain a valence quark–antiquark pair and one or more gluons.

All exotic mesons are classed as mesons because they are hadrons and carry zero baryon number. Of these, glueballs must be flavor singlets – that is, must have zero isospin, strangeness, charm, bottomness, and topness. Typically, every quark model meson comes in SU(3) flavor nonet: an octet and an associated flavor singlet. A glueball shows up as an extra (supernumerary) particle outside the nonet. 

In spite of such seemingly simple counting, the assignment of any given state as a glueball, tetraquark, or hybrid remains tentative even today, hence the preference for the more generic term exotic meson. Even when there is agreement that one of several states is one of these non-quark model mesons, the degree of mixing, and the precise assignment is fraught with uncertainties. There is also the considerable experimental labor of assigning quantum numbers to each state and crosschecking them in other experiments. As a result, all assignments outside the quark model are tentative. The remainder of this article outlines the situation as it stood at the end of 2004.

Lattice predictions
Lattice QCD predictions for glueballs are now fairly settled, at least when virtual quarks are neglected. The two lowest states are
2++ with mass of 
The 0−+ and exotic glueballs such as 0−− are all expected to lie above . Glueballs are necessarily isoscalar, with isospin  = 0.

The ground state hybrid mesons 0−+, 1−+, 1−−, and 2−+ all lie a little below . The best lattice computations to date are made in the quenched approximation, which neglects virtual quarks loops. As a result, these computations miss mixing with meson states.

0++ states
The data show five isoscalar resonances: (500), (980), (1370), (1500), and (1710). The decays and production of (1710) give strong evidence that it is also a meson.

Glueball candidate
The (1370) and (1500) cannot both be a quark model meson, because one is supernumerary. The decays also give some evidence that one of these could be a glueball.

Tetraquark candidate
The (980) has been identified by some authors as a tetraquark meson, along with the  = 1 states (980) and (800). Two long-lived (narrow in the jargon of particle spectroscopy) states: the scalar (0) state (2317) and the vector (1) meson (2460), observed at CLEO and BaBar, have also been tentatively identified as tetraquark states. However, for these, other explanations are possible.

2 states
Two isoscalar states are definitely identified: (1270) and the ′(1525). No other states have been consistently identified by all experiments. Hence it is difficult to say more about these states.

1 and other states
The two isovector exotics 1(1400) and 1(1600) seem to be well established experimentally. A recent coupled-channel analysis has shown these states, which were initially considered separate, are consistent with a single pole. A second exotic state is disfavored. The assignment of these states as hybrids is favored. Lattice QCD calculations show the lightest  with 1 quantum numbers has strong overlap with operators featuring gluonic construction.

The (1800) 0, (1900) 1 and the (1870) 2 are fairly well identified states, which have been tentatively identified as hybrids by some authors. If this identification is correct, then it is a remarkable agreement with lattice computations, which place several hybrids in this range of masses.

See also
Quark model, mesons, baryons, quarks, and gluons
Exotic hadrons and exotic baryons
Quantum chromodynamics, flavor, and the QCD vacuum
GlueX, an experiment which will explore the spectrum of glueballs and exotic mesons

References

Further reading

Mesons
Hypothetical composite particles